Baghmara Assembly constituency   is an assembly constituency in  the Indian state of Jharkhand.

Baghmara is a Vidhan sabha constituency, in the Dhanbad district of Jharkhand. Baghamara is known for the rich coal contents underground and a number of coal mines of B.C.C.L. are located henceworth here. The place is a B.C.C.L. township and very close to nature with much greenery, counteracting the pollution of the remainder of the district.

Members of Assembly 
2000: Jaleshwar Mahato, Samata Party
2005: Jaleshwar Mahato, Janata Dal (United)
2009: Dulu Mahato, Jharkhand Vikas Morcha (Prajatantrik)
2014: Dulu Mahato, Bharatiya Janata Party
2019: Dulu Mahato, Bharatiya Janata Party

See also
Vidhan Sabha
List of states of India by type of legislature

References
 
Schedule – XIII of Constituencies Order, 2008 of Delimitation of Parliamentary and Assembly constituencies Order, 2008 of the Election Commission of India 

Assembly constituencies of Jharkhand
Politics of Dhanbad district